Shigatoxigenic Escherichia coli (STEC) and verotoxigenic E. coli (VTEC) are strains of the bacterium Escherichia coli that produce Shiga toxin (or verotoxin).  Only a minority of the strains cause illness in humans. The ones that do are collectively known as enterohemorrhagic E. coli (EHEC) and are major causes of foodborne illness. When infecting the large intestine of humans, they often cause gastroenteritis, enterocolitis, and bloody diarrhea (hence the name "enterohemorrhagic") and sometimes cause a severe complication called hemolytic-uremic syndrome (HUS). Cattle is an important natural reservoir for EHEC because the colonised adult ruminants are asymptomatic. This is because they lack vascular expression of the target receptor for Shiga toxins. The group and its subgroups are known by various names. They are distinguished from other strains of intestinal pathogenic E. coli including enterotoxigenic E. coli (ETEC), enteropathogenic E. coli (EPEC), enteroinvasive E. coli (EIEC), enteroaggregative E. coli (EAEC), and diffusely adherent E. coli (DAEC).

Background 

The best known of these strains is O157:H7, but non-O157 strains cause an estimated 36,000 illnesses, 1,000 hospitalizations and 30 deaths in the United States yearly. Food safety specialists recognize "Big Six" strains: O26; O45; O103; O111; O121; and O145. A 2011 outbreak in Germany was caused by another STEC, O104:H4. This strain has both enteroaggregative and enterohemorrhagic properties. Both the O145 and O104 strains can cause hemolytic-uremic syndrome (HUS); the former strain shown to account for 2% to 51% of known HUS cases; an estimated 56% of such cases are caused by O145 and 14% by other EHEC strains.

EHECs that induce bloody diarrhea lead to HUS in 10% of cases. The clinical manifestations of postdiarrheal HUS include acute renal failure, microangiopathic hemolytic anemia, and thrombocytopenia. The verocytotoxin (shiga-like toxin) can directly damage renal and endothelial cells. Thrombocytopenia occurs as platelets are consumed by clotting. Hemolytic anemia results from intravascular fibrin deposition, increased fragility of red blood cells, and fragmentation.

Antibiotics are of questionable value and have not shown to be of clear clinical benefit. Antibiotics that interfere with DNA synthesis, such as fluoroquinolones, have been shown to induce the Stx-bearing bacteriophage and cause increased production of toxins. Attempts to block toxin production with antibacterials which target the ribosomal protein synthesis are conceptually more attractive. Plasma exchange offers a controversial but possibly helpful treatment. The use of antimotility agents (medications that suppress diarrhea by slowing bowel transit) in children under 10 years of age or in elderly patients should be avoided, as they increase the risk of HUS with EHEC infections.

The clinical presentation ranges from a mild and uncomplicated diarrhea to a hemorrhagic colitis with severe abdominal pain.  Serotype O157:H7 may trigger an infectious dose with 100 bacterial cells or fewer; other strain such as 104:H4 has also caused an outbreak in Germany 2011. Infections are most common in warmer months and in children under five years of age and are usually acquired from uncooked beef and unpasteurized milk and juice.  Initially a non-bloody diarrhea develops in patients after the bacterium attaches to the epithelium or the terminal ileum, cecum, and colon.  The subsequent production of toxins mediates the bloody diarrhea.  In children, a complication can be hemolytic uremic syndrome which then uses cytotoxins to attack the cells in the gut, so that bacteria can leak out into the blood and cause endothelial injury in locations such as the kidney by binding to globotriaosylceramide (Gb3).

Names
Names of the group and its subgroups include the following. There is some polysemy involved. Invariable synonymity is indicated by having the same color. Beyond that there is also some wider but variable synonymity. The first two (purple) in their narrowest sense are generally treated as hypernyms of the others (red and blue), although in less precise usage the red and blue have often been treated as synonyms of the purple. At least one reference holds "EHEC" to be mutually exclusive of "VTEC" and "STEC", but this does not match common usage, as many more publications lump all of the latter in with the former.

The current microbiology-based view on "Shiga-like toxin" (SLT) or "verotoxin" is that they should all be referred to as (versions of) Shiga toxin, as the difference is negligible. Following this view, all "VTEC" (blue) should be called "STEC" (red). Historically, a different name was sometimes used because the toxins are not exactly the same as the one found in Shigella dysenteriae, down to every last amino acid residue, although by this logic every "STEC" would be a "VTEC". The line can also be drawn to use "STEC" for Stx1-producing strains and "VTEC" for Stx2-producing strains, since Stx1 is closer to the Shiga toxin. Practically, the choice of words and categories is not as important as the understanding of clinical relevance.

Infectivity and virulence

The infectivity or the virulence of an EHEC strain depends on several factors, including the presence of fucose in the medium, the sensing of this sugar and the activation of EHEC pathogenicity island.

Regulation of the pathogenicity island

EHEC becomes pathogenic through the expression of the locus of enterocyte effacement (LEE) encoded on its pathogenicity island. However, when EHEC is not in a host this expression is a waste of energy and resources, so it is only activated if some molecules are sensed in the environment. 

When QseC or QseE bind with one of their interacting signalling molecule, they autophosphorylate and transfer its phosphate to the response regulator. QseC senses adrenaline, noradrenaline, and an Endonuclease I-SceIII, encoded by a mobile group I intron within the mitochondrial COX1 gene (AI3); whereas QseE senses adrenaline, noradrenaline, SO4 and PO4. These signals are a clear indication to the bacteria that they are no longer free in the environment, but in the gut.

As a result, QseC phosphorylates QseB (which activates flagella), KpdE (which activates the LEE) and QseF. QseE phosphorylates QseF. The products QseBC and QseEF repress the expression of FusK and FusR. FusK and FusR are the two components of a system to repress the transcription of the LEE genes. FusK is a sensor kinase which is able to sense many sugars among which fucose. When fucose is present in the medium FusK phosphorylates FusR which represses LEE expression. 

Thus when EHEC enters the gut there is a competition between the signals coming from QseC and QseF, and the signal coming from FusK. The first two would like to activate virulence, but Fusk stops it because the mucous layer, which is a source of fucose, isolates enterocytes from bacteria making the synthesis of the virulence factors useless. However, when fucose concentration decreases because bacterial cells find an unprotected area of the epithelium, then the expression of LEE genes will not be repressed by FusR, and KpdE will strongly activate them. In summary, the combined effect of the QseC/QseF and FusKR provide a fine-tuning system of LEE expression which saves energy and allow the mechanisms of virulence to be expressed only when the chances of success are higher.

Shiga toxins 
Shiga toxins are a major virulence factor of EHEC. The toxins interact with intestinal epithelium and can cause systematic complications in humans like HUS and cerebral dysfunction if they enter the circulation. In EHEC, Shiga toxins are encoded lysogenic bacteriophages. The toxins bind to cell-surface glycolipid receptor Gb3, which causes the cell to take the toxin in via endocytosis. The Shiga toxins target ribosomal RNA, which inhibits protein synthesis and causes apoptosis. The reason EHEC are symptomless in cattle is because the cattle do not have vascular expression of Gb3 unlike humans. Thus, the Shiga toxins cannot pass through the intestinal epithelium into circulation.

FusKR complex 

This complex, formed by two components (FusK and FusR) has the function in EHEC to detect the presence of fucose in the environment and regulate the activation of LEE genes.
FusK: is encoded by the z0462 gene. This gene is an histidine kinase sensor. It detects fucose and then phosphorylates the Z0463 gene activating it.
FusR: is encoded by the z0463 gene. This gene is a repressor of LEE genes. When z0462 gene detects fucose, phosphorylates and activates the Z0463 gene, which will repress the expression of 'le r', the regulator of the LEE genes. If z0463 gene is not active, the expression of the gene ler would not be repressed. The expression of 'ler' activates the remaining genes in the pathogenicity island inducing virulence.
At the same time, the system FusKR inhibits the Z0461 gene, a fucose transporter.

Fucose increases the activation of the FusKR system, which inhibits the z0461 gene, which controls the metabolism of fucose. This is a mechanisms that is useful to avoid the competition for fucose with other strains of E. coli which are usually more efficient at using fucose as a carbon source. High concentrations of fucose in the medium also increases the repression of the LEE genes.

With low levels of fucose in the environment, the FusKR system is inactive, and this means that z0461 gene is transcribed, thus increasing the metabolism of fucose. Furthermore, a low concentration of fucose is an indication of unprotected epithelium, thus the repression of ler genes will disappear and the expression of the LEE genes will allow to attack the adjacent cells.

See also
 Fucose
 Gut flora
 Mucin
 Virulence

Notes

References

Further reading

External links

Escherichia coli
Foodborne illnesses